HMS Goodall (K479) was a British Captain-class frigate of the Royal Navy in commission during World War II. Originally constructed as the United States Navy Evarts-class destroyer escort USS Reybold (DE-275), she served in the Royal Navy from 1943 until her sinking in 1945.

Construction and transfer
The ship was ordered on 25 January 1942 and laid down as the U.S. Navy destroyer escort USS Reybold (DE-275) by the Boston Navy Yard in Boston, Massachusetts, on 20 May 1943. She was launched on 8 July 1943. The United States transferred the ship to the United Kingdom under Lend-Lease upon completion on 4 October 1943.

Service history

Commissioned into service in the Royal Navy as HMS Goodall (K479) on 4 October 1943 simultaneously with her transfer, the ship served on convoy escort duty.

On 29 April 1945, Goodall was escorting Convoy RA 66 in the Barents Sea near the entrance to the Kola Inlet when the  fired G7es – known to the Allies as "GNAT" – torpedoes at the convoys escort vessels at 21:00. Goodall sighted one of the torpedoes, which missed her. At about 22:00, the  hit Goodall at position  with a GNAT, causing her ammunition magazine to detonate. The explosion blew away the forward part of the ship and killed Lieutenant Commander Fulton and 94 other crewmen. Goodalls crew abandoned ship, and on 30 April 1945 the British frigate  sank U-286 with gunfire.

References

External links

Navsource Online: Destroyer Escort Photo Archive reybold (DE-275)/Goodall (K-479)

Captain-class frigates
Evarts-class destroyer escorts
World War II frigates of the United Kingdom
World War II frigates and destroyer escorts of the United States
Ships built in Boston
1943 ships
Ships sunk by German submarines in World War II
Shipwrecks in the Barents Sea
Maritime incidents in April 1945